Ethan Cooper (born June 11, 1995) is an American football guard who is currently a free agent. He played college football at Indiana University of Pennsylvania. He signed with the Pittsburgh Steelers as an undrafted free agent in 2017.

High school career
Cooper attended Central Dauphin East High School. He grew up a fan of the Philadelphia Eagles.

College career
Cooper attended Indiana University of Pennsylvania and played for the Crimson Hawks football team. He was recruited as a defensive player but was moved to the offensive line as a freshman. Coming into his senior season, Cooper made the switch from left guard to right tackle. After the season he was named a Division II All-American. He finished his career with 37 consecutive starts on the offensive line.

Professional career
Cooper was rated as the 19th-best offensive guard in the 2017 NFL Draft by ESPN. Cooper worked out for five NFL teams the Atlanta Falcons, Houston Texans, Jacksonville Jaguars, Philadelphia Eagles and Pittsburgh Steelers. He also attended a pro-day at Temple University. NFL.com projected him to be selected in the sixth or seventh round of the draft, and Cooper was invited to the NFL combine. Despite this, he went undrafted.

Pittsburgh Steelers
Cooper signed with the Pittsburgh Steelers as an undrafted free agent on April 29, 2017. He was waived on September 2, 2017.

New York Giants
On October 11, 2017, Cooper was signed to the New York Giants' practice squad. He signed a reserve/future contract with the Giants on January 1, 2018. He was waived by the Giants on July 12, 2018.

Green Bay Packers
On July 13, 2018, Cooper was claimed off waivers by the Green Bay Packers. He was waived on August 6, 2018.

Kansas City Chiefs
On August 7, 2018, Cooper was claimed off waivers by the Kansas City Chiefs. He was waived on September 1, 2018.

References

External links
NFL profile
Steelers bio

1995 births
Living people
Players of American football from Pennsylvania
People from Dauphin County, Pennsylvania
American football offensive guards
IUP Crimson Hawks football players
Pittsburgh Steelers players
New York Giants players
Green Bay Packers players
Kansas City Chiefs players